Lost Wages may refer to:
 A nickname for the city or urban area of Las Vegas, Nevada, referring to money losses by tourists due to gambling
 The fictional city, modelled after Las Vegas, in which the 1987 video game Leisure Suit Larry in the Land of the Lounge Lizards is set
 Pure economic losses of wages or finances